"Lay Down" is a 1972 song by the Strawbs.

Lay Down may also refer to:

 "Lay Down" (DMA's song), 2015
 "Lay Down", a song by Caravan Palace from the 2015 album Robot Face
 "Lay Down", a song by Natasha Bedingfield from the 2007 album N.B.
 "Lay Down", a song by Priestess from the 2005 album Hello Master
 "Lay Down", a 2017 song by Touch Sensitive

Other uses
 "Lay Down (Candles in the Rain)", a 1970 song by Melanie

See also
 Keel laying or "laying down", the formal recognition of the start of a ship's construction. 
 Way Down (disambiguation)